The Los Ebanos Ferry or El Chalán, formally known as the Los Ebanos-Diaz Ordaz Ferry, is a hand-operated cable ferry that travels across the Rio Grande between Los Ebanos, Texas, and Gustavo Díaz Ordaz, Tamaulipas. It is the last of its kind along the entire stretch of the Rio Grande. The city of Los Ebanos was named after the Texas Ebony (Ebenopsis ebano) that anchors the ferry.

Border crossing

The Los Ebanos Port of Entry is the U.S. Customs and Border Protection facility that is used to inspect passengers and vehicles entering the U.S. from Gustavo Díaz Ordaz, Tamaulipas, via the Los Ebanos Ferry. The ferry was first opened in 1950. It is the only remaining international ferry operation on the U.S.-Mexico border. A new border station was built in 2011.

References

External links

Transportation in Hidalgo County, Texas
Historic American Engineering Record in Texas
International bridges in Texas
International bridges in Tamaulipas
Ferries of Texas
Cable ferries
Cable ferries in the United States